Eric T. Fick is a retired United States Air Force lieutenant general who last served as the program executive officer of the F-35 Lightning II Joint Program Office. Previously, he was the deputy program executive officer for the same office.

Effective dates of promotions

References

Living people
Place of birth missing (living people)
Recipients of the Air Force Distinguished Service Medal
Recipients of the Defense Superior Service Medal
Recipients of the Legion of Merit
United States Air Force generals
Year of birth missing (living people)